Amice de Clare (c. 1220 – 1284) was the daughter of Gilbert de Clare, 4th Earl of Hertford and Isabel Marshal. She married, firstly, Baldwin de Redvers, 6th Earl of Devon, and secondly Robert de . She founded Buckland Abbey.

Family and children
In 1235 she married the 6th Earl of Devon and had issue:

 Baldwin de Redvers, 7th Earl of Devon.
 Isabella de Redvers, 8th Countess of Devon (or Isabella de Fortibus) (died 1293), married William de Forz, 4th Earl of Albemarle. After the death of her brother, she became Countess of Devon in her own right, and Lady of the Isle of Wight.

1284 deaths
Year of birth uncertain
13th-century English nobility
Amice
13th-century English women
Devon
Daughters of British earls